Hymenobacter rubripertinctus is a Gram-negative, aerobic, rod-shaped and non-motile bacterium from the genus of Hymenobacter which has been isolated from soil from the Antarctic tundra.

References 

rubripertinctus
Bacteria described in 2018